Alexander Duncan (1788 – March 23, 1853) was a U.S. Representative from Ohio for four terms from 1837 to 1845.

Biography 
Born in Bottle Hill (now Madison), Morris County, New Jersey, Duncan studied and practiced medicine.  He moved to Ohio and settled in Cincinnati.  He served as member of the Ohio House of Representatives in 1828, 1829, 1831, and 1832.  He served in the Ohio Senate 1832–1834.

Duncan was elected as a Democrat to the Twenty-fifth and Twenty-sixth Congresses (March 4, 1837 – March 3, 1841).
He was an unsuccessful candidate for reelection in 1840 to the Twenty-seventh Congress but came back to win a seat in the Twenty-eighth Congress (March 4, 1843 – March 3, 1845). He did not run in 1844 for reelection to the Twenty-ninth Congress but instead resumed the practice of his profession.

He died in Madisonville (now a part of Cincinnati), Hamilton County, Ohio, March 23, 1853, and is interred in Laurel Cemetery.

Sources

1788 births
1853 deaths
Politicians from Cincinnati
People from Madison, New Jersey
Democratic Party members of the Ohio House of Representatives
Democratic Party Ohio state senators
Physicians from Cincinnati
Democratic Party members of the United States House of Representatives from Ohio
19th-century American politicians
19th-century American physicians